Prudentov is a rural locality (a khutor) and the administrative center of Revolyutsionnoye Rural Settlement, Pallasovsky District, Volgograd Oblast, Russia. The population was 997 as of 2010. There are 18 streets.

Geography 
Prudentov is located 87 km southwest of Pallasovka (the district's administrative centre) by road. Zolotari is the nearest rural locality.

References 

Rural localities in Pallasovsky District